Stress Is Three (Original title: Stress-es tres-tres) is a 1968 Spanish drama film directed by Carlos Saura. The film stars Geraldine Chaplin and Fernando Cebrián as a troubled married couple. Their marital problems are partially a consequence of Spain's rapidly modernizing consumer society. Saura explains that his film is "the study of the crisis in a seemingly developed society, the crisis of the modern Spaniard who, underneath the new veneer, is still a medieval man, who still has working within him the old taboos and moral repressions from his religious past."  The film is experimental in nature, whereby Saura moved away from several of the formulas of his previous two films, Peppermint Frappé and La caza. Saura noted, "At the root of it I had the sense that in Peppermint Frappé I was very constrained by story and I wanted to unbind myself. So, I made Stress Is Three, Three as a kind of liberation."

Plot
Set in one-day, three people embark together on a car trip from Madrid to Almeria. Fernando (Cebrián) is a successful industrialist, however he is dismayed that his personal life does not reflect his glittering career. He is insecure about his faltering marriage to Teresa (Chaplin), whom he believes is having an affair with his best friend, Antonio (Galiardo).

Cast
Geraldine Chaplin as Teresa
Juan Luis Galiardo as Antonio
Fernando Cebrián as Fernando
Porfiria Sanchíz as Tía 
Fernando Sánchez Polack as Guarda
Humberto Sempere as Niño 
Charo Soriano

References

External links
 

1968 films
1960s Spanish-language films
1960s drama road movies
Films directed by Carlos Saura
1968 drama films
Spanish drama road movies
Films shot in Almería